The 1899 Rhode Island gubernatorial election was held on April 5, 1899. Incumbent Republican Elisha Dyer Jr. defeated Democratic nominee George W. Greene with 56.36% of the vote.

General election

Candidates
Major party candidates
Elisha Dyer Jr., Republican
George W. Greene, Democratic

Other candidates
Thomas F. Herrick, Socialist Labor
Joseph A. Peckham, Prohibition

Results

References

1899
Rhode Island
1899 Rhode Island elections